Justice Cushing may refer to:

William Cushing, associate justice of the United States Supreme Court
Caleb Cushing, associate justice of the Massachusetts Supreme Judicial Court
Edmund L. Cushing, associate justice of the New Hampshire Supreme Court
John Cushing (judge), associate justice of the Massachusetts Supreme Judicial Court
John Cushing Jr., associate justice of the Massachusetts Supreme Judicial Court
Nathan Cushing, associate justice of the Massachusetts Supreme Judicial Court
Stephen S. Cushing, associate justice of the Vermont Supreme Court